George Henry Raymond Blackwood (born 4 June 1997) is an Australian professional footballer who plays as a striker for A-League Men club Adelaide United.

Born in Sydney, Blackwood played youth football for APIA Leichhardt Tigers before making his professional debut for Sydney FC in 2014.

Blackwood has represented Australia at under-20 and at under-23 level.

Early life 
Blackwood was born to British parents and grew up in Berowra, New South Wales. He attended Asquith Boys High School. Blackwood has two younger brothers and is a cricket fan.

Club career

Early career 
Blackwood spent a month training at Colchester United in 2013 after winning a scholarship award in Australia.

Sydney FC 
George was first called up to Sydney FC's senior squad for a match against Melbourne City in October 2014. He scored his first goal for the club in a draw against Central Coast Mariners on 16 March 2016 with a shot from outside the box. Blackwood denied a new contract from Sydney FC at the end of the 2016–17 season.

Adelaide United 
In July 2017, Adelaide United signed Blackwood. Blackwood's first professional goal for the Adelaide-based club came from a penalty in the Round of 16 of the 2017 FFA Cup against rivals Melbourne Victory. Blackwood made an appearance in the 2017 FFA Cup Final on 21 November 2017 against former club Sydney FC, coming on as a substitute in the 73rd minute. Blackwood was released by the club on 26 August 2020 to pursue a new opportunity

Oldham Athletic 
On 6 September 2020, Blackwood signed with Oldham Athletic on a two-year deal. Blackwood scored his first goal for Oldham on 3 November 2020 which saw the team go on to win the game 2–1. Blackwood developed a fracture in his back which saw a lack of appearances for the English club. Following the conclusion of the 2020–21 EFL League Two season, the club had announced that they had mutually agreed to terminate his contract, Blackwood then returned to Australia.

Return to Adelaide United 
Blackwood returned to Adelaide United on 2 August 2021 signing a two-year deal. In his first game back for the club, Blackwood dispatched a penalty in a Round of 32 match of the 2021 FFA Cup against Floreat Athena.

International career 
Blackwood was first selected for the Australian under-20 team for the 2014 AFF U-19 Youth Championship in September 2014.

In March 2015, Blackwood was called up to the Australian under-23 team to replace injured Sydney FC teammate Terry Antonis for 2016 AFC U-23 Championship qualification.

Career statistics

Club

Honours

Club 
Sydney FC
A-League Premiership: 2016–17

Country 
Australia
 AFF U-19 Youth Championship: 2016

Individual 
 National Youth League Player of the Year: 2014–15
 AFF U-19 Youth Championship Golden Boot: 2016

References

External links 

George Blackwood profile at SydneyFC.com

Living people
1997 births
Association football forwards
Australian soccer players
Australian people of English descent
Sydney FC players
Adelaide United FC players
Oldham Athletic A.F.C. players
A-League Men players
English Football League players
Australia under-20 international soccer players
Soccer players from Sydney
Expatriate footballers in England
Australian expatriate sportspeople in England